is an adult Japanese visual novel developed and published by ALcot. It was released for Windows as a DVD ROM on August 31, 2012, and released as a regular edition on February 22, 2013. A manga for Tokyo Hero Project was published by Enterbrain, and serialized in Enterbrain's Tech Gian magazine.

Media
An audio CD was released by ALcot on December 28, 2012, entitled Naka no Hito nado Inai! Tokyo Hero Project Original Soundtracks. It contains the original soundtrack for the game, and contains two discs. The first disc has a length sixty four minutes long and fifty seven seconds. The second disc has a length of fifty four minutes and ten seconds.
A 129-page visual fan book entitled Naka no Hito nado Inai! Tokyo Hero Project Visual Fan Book was published by Max on June 1, 2013. One volume of a manga derived from the game was published by Enterbrain on January 25, 2014, and serialized in the Tech Gian magazine. Illustrations in the manga were provided by Yamadori Ofū. It can also be read on ALcot's official site.

Reception
On Getchu.com, Tokyo Hero Project ranked No.3 in the monthly sales ranking of August 2012, the month of the game's release. It also made twenty seventh place in September 2012's monthly sales ranking.

Notes

References

External links
 ALcot's official site for Tokyo Hero Project 
 

Enterbrain manga
Eroge
2014 manga
Japan-exclusive video games
Manga based on video games
Seinen manga
Video games developed in Japan
Visual novels
Windows games
Windows-only games
ALcot games